Insignificant Details of a Random Episode is a 2011 Russian comedy short film directed by Mikhail Mestetsky.

Plot 
The two trains stopped opposite each other and strange relationships began to develop between the passengers.

Cast 
 Kirill Käro
 Miriam Sekhon
 Ilya Zaslavskiy

References

External links 
 

2011 films
2010s Russian-language films
Russian comedy short films
2011 short films
2011 comedy films